'Agrarian Union may refer to:

Agrarian Union "Aleksandar Stamboliyski", a political party in Bulgaria
Agrarian Union (Poland)